The Return of Lanny Budd is the 11th and final novel in Upton Sinclair's Lanny Budd series. First published in 1953, the story covers the period from 1946 to 1949.

Plot

References

1953 American novels
American historical novels
Novels by Upton Sinclair
Viking Press books